John Wayne Conlee (born August 11, 1946) is an American country music singer. 

Between 1978 and 2004, Conlee charted a total of 32 singles on the Billboard Hot Country Songs charts, and recorded 11 studio albums. His singles include seven No. 1 hits: "Lady Lay Down", "Backside of Thirty", "Common Man", "I'm Only in It for the Love", "In My Eyes", "As Long As I'm Rockin' with You" and "Got My Heart Set on You". In addition to these, Conlee had 14 other songs reach the Top Ten.

Conlee has been a member of the Grand Ole Opry since 1981.

Early life 
Conlee was born on a tobacco farm in Versailles, Kentucky. By age 10, Conlee had begun singing and playing guitar, and later sang tenor in a barbershop quartet. 

Conlee did not immediately take up a musical career, instead becoming a licensed mortician, employed by Duell-Clark Funeral Chapel, and later a disc jockey at radio station WLAC.

Music career 

In pursuit of a music career, Conlee moved to Nashville, Tennessee, by 1971. He signed to ABC Records in 1976. Conlee charted for the first time in 1978 with "Rose Colored Glasses", a No. 5 hit on the Billboard Hot Country Singles chart, as well as the title track on his 1978 debut album. The album produced his first two No. 1 hits with "Lady Lay Down" and "Backside of Thirty".

Following ABC's merger with MCA Records, Conlee released his 1979 album Forever on MCA. Its singles, "Before My Time" (No. 2) and "Baby, You're Something" (No. 7), were top ten hits. A second MCA release, Friday Night Blues, produced two more No. 2 hits: the title track and "She Can't Say That Anymore". The song "What I Had with You" (No. 12) followed. The 1981 album, With Love, accounted for yet another hit with "Miss Emily's Picture" (No. 2), which Conlee performed live on Hee Haw on January 3, 1981.

Conlee's 1982 album Busted led off with a cover of the Harlan Howard song of the same name. The album's last single, "Common Man", returned him to the top of the charts in 1983. Three more No. 1 hits came from the 1983 album In My Eyes: "I'm Only in It for the Love" (co-written with Kix Brooks), the title track and "As Long as I'm Rockin' with You". MCA also released a Greatest Hits album in 1983.

Blue Highway in 1984, his last studio album for MCA, produced another No. 2 with "Years After You". A year later, a second Greatest Hits album produced his last MCA single with the No. 5 "Old School", before he moved to Columbia Records. Conlee's first Columbia release, Harmony, gave him his last No. 1 hit with "Got My Heart Set on You" in 1986. A second and final album for Columbia, American Faces, reached the Top 10 for the last time with "Domestic Life". This was followed by "Mama's Rockin' Chair" at No. 11 (his last Top 40 hit). From there, Conlee moved to 16th Avenue Records, releasing Fellow Travelers in 1989.

In 2005, Conlee donated his concert performance of "Rose Colored Glasses" at the Wildhorse Saloon in Nashville, to benefit the Lymphatic Research Foundation in New York. Conlee sang his signature song and auctioned off a pair of "rose-colored glasses" with the proceeds going to LRF.

Conlee has appeared on Larry's Country Diner and Wednesday Night Prayer Meeting (released on DVD/CD) via RFD-TV and Country Road TV.

Discography

Albums

Compilation albums

Singles

Music videos

References

External links 
 
 John Conlee Interview NAMM Oral History Library (2018)

1946 births
Living people
American country singer-songwriters
American male singer-songwriters
MCA Records artists
Country musicians from Kentucky
Grand Ole Opry members
People from Versailles, Kentucky
16th Avenue Records artists
ABC Records artists
Columbia Records artists
Singer-songwriters from Kentucky